Malcolm Pooley (born 27 July 1969) is an English former cricketer. He played for Gloucestershire between 1988 and 1990.

References

External links

1969 births
Living people
English cricketers
Gloucestershire cricketers
Sportspeople from Truro
Cornwall cricketers